Boaz Rodkin was the Ambassador of Israel to Albania from April 2015 until 2019. Since 2016, Rodkin has been the non-resident Ambassador to Bosnia and Herzegovina.

Early life
Rodkin, born and raised in Haifa, graduated from the Hebrew University of Jerusalem with a bachelor’s degree in International Relations, and earned a Master's degree in Public Policy from Tel Aviv University.

Ambassador to Albania

Rodkin was involved in what has been described as helping “to establish the ground-breaking scheduled direct flights between Tel Aviv and Tirana, bringing a record-breaking number of Israeli tourists to the Western Balkan country.”

References

People from Haifa
Tel Aviv University alumni
Ambassadors of Israel to Albania
New York University Stern School of Business faculty
Ambassadors of Israel to Bosnia and Herzegovina
Year of birth missing (living people)
Living people